The 2019–20 Coupe de France preliminary rounds, Nouvelle-Aquitaine was the qualifying competition to decide which teams from the leagues of the Nouvelle-Aquitaine region of France took part in the main competition from the seventh round.

A total of twelve teams qualified from the Nouvelle-Aquitaine preliminary rounds. In 2018–19 Bergerac Périgord FC progressed furthest in the main competition, reaching the round of 32 before losing to Orléans after extra time.

Schedule
The first two rounds of the qualifying competition took place on the weekends of 25 August and 1 September 2019. A total of 536 teams participated in the first round, being all the engaged teams from Régional 3 (tier 8) and below, plus 17 teams from Régional 2 (tier 7), selected according to performance in last years competition. 70 teams entered at the second round stage, being the remaining 39 teams from Régional 2 and 31 teams from Régional 1 (tier 6).

The third round draw was made on 5 September 2019. The 11 teams from Championnat National 3 (tier 5) entered at this stage.

The fourth round draw was made on 20 September 2019. The four teams from Championnat National 2 (tier 4) entered at this stage. 47 ties were drawn.

The fifth round draw was made on 3 October 2019. The single team from Championnat National (tier 3) entered at this stage. 24 ties were drawn.

The sixth round draw was made on 17 October 2019. Twelve ties were drawn.

First round
These matches were played on 23, 24 and 25 August 2019, with one match rescheduled to 1 September 2019.

Second round
These matches were played between 30 August 2019 and 8 September 2019

Third round
These matches were played on 14 and 15 September 2019

Fourth round
These matches were played on 28 and 29 September 2019

Fifth round
These matches were played on 12 and 13 October 2019

Sixth round
These matches were played on 26 and 27 October 2019

References

Preliminary rounds